Perses may refer to:

Characters in Greek mythology
 Perses (Titan), son of the Titan siblings, Crius and Eurybia
 Perses (son of Perseus)
 Perses (brother of Aeetes), a son of Helios and the Oceanid Perseis

People
 Perses (brother of Hesiod)

See also
 Perse (disambiguation)
 Perseus (disambiguation)